The Chicago Bears are a National Football League (NFL) franchise based in Chicago.  This article lists all the individual and team statistical records complied since the franchise's birth in 1920.

Table key

Individual club appearance records

Individual career records

Individual single season records

Individual single game records

Individual rookie season records

Individual career postseason records

Individual single game postseason records

Team records

Miscellaneous club game records
Longest run from scrimmage – Bill Osmanski rushed 86 yards vs. the Chicago Cardinals, 10/15/39.
Longest pass from scrimmage – Bo Farrington caught 98-yard pass at the Detroit Lions, 10/8/61.
Longest play in Bears history – 108 yard missed field goal return, Nathan Vasher, vs. San Francisco 49ers, 11/13/05; Devin Hester, at New York Giants, 11/12/06.
Most touchdowns (game) – 9, vs. San Francisco 49ers, 12/12/65
Most times sacked in a game – 10, vs. New York Giants, 10/3/10
Most takeaways in a game – 12†, at Detroit Lions 11/22/42 (7 int, 5 fum)
Most points allowed in a game – 55, at Detroit Lions 11/27/97, at Green Bay Packers 11/9/2014.

†-tied NFL record

References

Records
Chicago Bears